Valaiyapettai is a village in the Kumbakonam taluk of Thanjavur district, Tamil Nadu, India.

Demographics 

As per the 2001 census, Valaiyapettai had a total population of 4810 with 2390 males and 2420 females. The sex ratio was 1013. The literacy rate was 69.37%.

References 

 

Villages in Thanjavur district